Steven Malcolmson (born 9 April 1983) – also known as Steve Malcolmson, is a Scottish songwriter, record producer, originating from Glasgow, Scotland.



Early life 

Steven Malcolmson was born in Glasgow. He grew up in a council house, living in East End, Parkhead with his parents and siblings. Malcolmson attended Whitehill Secondary School, Dropping out in the year 1998 as the music class was stopped due to a lack of funding.

Career 

He began creating music in his early teens, teaching himself guitar and piano from books, using software Cubase to create his earliest forms of music. Joining the band "theoceanfloor" at nineteen – and later "Co-pilot Effect" – led him to creating indie music. However he later developed a passion for pop. He got in touch with Richard "Biff" Stannard who was willing to mentor him.

2010–present: Steven Malcolmson 

Steve wrote the song "The Way Love Goes" which was pitched to platinum selling artist Lemar. It became the lead single for Lemar's Greatest Hits album, with the song peaking at No. 8 on the UK Singles chart he was signed in 2010 to Major 3rd Music/BMG Rights Management. Writing with music production team Biffco he began to co-write for X Factor finalists.

He worked with Joe McElderry on his Wide Awake album with the song "Feel the Fire" as well as doing production work for Ellie Goulding on the single "Lights" which charted at No. 2 in the US. and No 49 in the UK. Steve also worked with Kylie Minogue on the song "Love Love Love" which was leaked onto video-sharing website YouTube resulting in the song not being featured on Kylie Minogue's Aphrodite album.

Discography

References

1983 births
Living people
21st-century Scottish male singers
Scottish songwriters
Scottish record producers
Scottish pop guitarists
Scottish male guitarists
Scottish keyboardists
Musicians from Glasgow
21st-century British guitarists